Baby Gate is an album by Italian singer Mina, distributed back to back with album Mina®.

Track listing

Credits
Mina – vocals
Pino Presti – arranger/conductor
Nuccio Rinaldis – sound engineer

1974 albums
Mina (Italian singer) albums
Italian-language albums
Albums conducted by Pino Presti
Albums arranged by Pino Presti